Ermessende of Pelet was the last heiress of the County of Melgueil, in southern France, and  the last countess before it was joined with the County of Toulouse.

Ermessende was the daughter of Bernard V Pelet, who had married Beatrice, daughter of Bernard IV of Melgueil and widow of Berenguer Ramon, Count of Provence. As her consort Bernard V ruled the county from 1146 to 1170.

Ermessende first married Pierre Bermond, lord of Anduze, and they ruled Melgueil from 1170 to 1172 when he died. In 1173 she married Raymond VI of Toulouse.

After 1176 Raymond VI continued to rule Melgueil until 1190.  He did not die until 1222.

External links
see Ermessende

Occitan nobility
1176 deaths
Year of birth unknown